Dai is a Welsh masculine given name, a hypocorism of Dafydd or David, as well as a masculine Japanese given name. Notable people with the name include:

 Dai Buell (died 1939), American pianist and teacher
 Dai Davies (footballer, born 1880)
 Dai Davies (footballer, born 1948)
 Dai Davies (politician)
 David Duckham, English international rugby union player, also known as Dai Duckham
Dai Greene, a British hurdler
, Japanese classical composer
 Dai Henwood, New Zealand comedian
, Japanese voice actor
 Dai Nagao, Japanese composer, musician and producer
, Japanese basketball coach
, Japanese screenwriter and musician
 Dai Vernon, a Canadian magician
 Dai Ward, Wales international footballer
 Dai Young, Wales international rugby union player

Fictional characters
Dai, the title character in the manga series Dragon Quest: The Adventure of Dai
Dai Blackthorn, a character from the role-playing game GURPS
Dai Bread, a bigamist character in Dylan Thomas' 1954 Radio play Under Milk Wood.
Mrs Dai Bread One, Dai Bread's first wife.
Mrs Dai Bread Two, Dai Bread's second wife.
Dai Dickins, character in the Discworld novel Night Watch, and martyr of the Glorious Revolution Twenty-Fifth of May
Dai Greatcoat, a character from David Jones' In Parenthesis 
, a fictional character from the anime series Super Doll Licca-chan
Dai Station, a character from the Welsh animation series Ivor the Engine
Dai Bando, a minor character in Richard Llewellyn's novel How Green Was My Valley, played by Rhys Williams in the John Ford film of the same name

Japanese masculine given names
Welsh masculine given names